Gran Reserva. El origen is a Spanish drama television series, working as a prequel to Gran Reserva. Produced by Televisión Española in collaboration with Bambú Producciones, it aired from May 2013 to August 2013. It focuses on the events happening four decades before the original series.

Premise 
The plot is set in 1967 in the fictional winemaking village of Lasiesta (La Rioja).

The series deals with intrigues influencing the events of the Gran Reserva series more than forty years later, including the relations between the Cortázar and the Reverte families and the struggle between the Cortázar family and a third family, the Miranda, the dominant winemaking power in the region at the time, led by the marriage formed by Santiago Miranda (Manuel Blas) and Elvira Prieto (Silvia Marsó).

Cast

Production and release 
Gran Reserva. El origen is a prequel series to Gran Reserva. Produced by Televisión Española (TVE) in collaboration with Bambú Producciones, filming started on 5 Abril 2013. The serial premiered in the sobremesa time slot on 13 May 2013. Given the unconvincing viewership figures, TVE decided to cut the number of episodes from the initially intended 130 to 82, and to program back to back episodes to bring the series to its end sooner. The broadcasting run ended on 23 August 2013.

References 

Spanish-language television shows
Television shows set in La Rioja (Spain)
Television series set in 1967
Spanish television soap operas
Prequel television series
2010s Spanish drama television series
2013 Spanish television series debuts
2013 Spanish television series endings
Television series about wine
Television series by Bambú Producciones
La 1 (Spanish TV channel) network series